The 2015 Australian Open was a tennis tournament that took place at Melbourne Park from 19 January to 1 February 2015. It was the 103rd edition of the Australian Open, and the first Grand Slam tournament of the year.

Stan Wawrinka was the defending champion in men's singles but lost to four-time Australian Open champion Novak Djokovic in the semi-finals. Reigning women's champion Li Na did not defend her title, as she retired from professional tennis in September, 2014. Novak Djokovic won an Open Era record fifth men's singles crown by defeating Andy Murray in the final, and this was the third time they met each other in the final. Serena Williams won an Open Era record six women's singles championships by defeating Maria Sharapova in the final, and this was the second time they met each other in the final.

Simone Bolelli and Fabio Fognini teamed up to win the men's doubles title for the first time over the team of Pierre-Hugues Herbert and Nicolas Mahut. Bethanie Mattek-Sands and Lucie Šafářová teamed up to win the women's doubles crown for the first time over the team of Chan Yung-jan and Zheng Jie. Martina Hingis and Leander Paes teamed up to win the mixed doubles title, it was the second for Hingis and third for Paes, over the defending champions Kristina Mladenovic and Daniel Nestor.

Tournament

The 2015 Australian Open was the 103rd edition of the tournament and was held at Melbourne Park in Melbourne, Victoria, Australia.

The tournament was run by the International Tennis Federation (ITF) and was part of the 2015 ATP World Tour and the 2015 WTA Tour calendars under the Grand Slam category. The tournament consisted of both men's and women's singles and doubles draws as well as a mixed doubles event. There were singles and doubles events for both boys and girls (players under 18), which was part of the Grade A category of tournaments, and also singles, doubles and quad events for men's and women's wheelchair tennis players as part of the NEC tour under the Grand Slam category.

The tournament was played on hard courts and took place over a series of 16 courts with Plexicushion surface, including the three main showcourts – Rod Laver Arena, Hisense Arena and Margaret Court Arena. The latter was unveiled with a capacity increase from 6,000 to 7,500 and also as the third Melbourne Park venue with fully operational retractable roof to make the Australian Open the first Grand Slam tournament with three such tennis stadiums. Partly due to the new roof, the 2015 event set an all-time attendance record of 703,899 fans. The cooler than normal temperatures may also have played a role.

Broadcast
The tournament was broadcast in more than 200 countries around the world. In Australia, all matches were broadcast live by the Seven Network on the network's primary channel under the banner Seven Sport. In the Asia/Pacific region, the tournament was covered by CCTV, iQiyi, SMG (China), Fiji One (Fiji), Sony SIX (India), Wowow, NHK (Japan), Sky TV (New Zealand) and Fox Sports Asia, in Europe by Eurosport, NOS (Netherlands), SRG SSR (Switzerland) and BBC (United Kingdom), in the Middle East by beIN Sports, in Africa by SuperSport, while in the Americas coverage was provided by ESPN.

In 2015, live coverage emanated from all sixteen courts. Qualifying tournaments, draw ceremony and Kids' Day were shown on official tournament website, AusOpen.com.

Controversy
Following a second round victory in Women's singles Canadian Eugenie Bouchard was approached by an interviewer, Ian Cohen, who cited tweets made by Bouchard the previous evening which complimented fellow competitor Serena Williams's on court attire.  The interviewer, explaining that Williams "was kind enough to give us a twirl", asked Bouchard to offer her own twirl.  Though Bouchard obliged, the request was met with criticism, with many accusing the interviewer of being sexist. The controversy was referred to by some media outlets as "twirlgate."  Billie Jean King responded to the interview by saying "This is truly sexist. If you ask the women, you have to ask the guys to twirl as well."  For her part, Bouchard said the request would not be sexist if men were asked to "flex their muscles and stuff."  At least one media outlet pointed out that as part of a pre-tournament interview Rafael Nadal was asked to take off his shirt for the enjoyment of female fans.

Point and prize money distribution

Point distribution
Below is a series of tables for each of the competitions showing the ranking points on offer for each event.

Senior points

Wheelchair points

Junior points

Prize money
The Australian Open total prize money for 2015 was increased to A$40,000,000, with men's and women's singles champions to receive a tournament-record 3.1 million Australian dollars reward. Out of total prize money, A$28,796,000 was paid for players competing in singles main draw, further A$1,344,000 for players, who lost in qualifying, A$5,165,200 – for doubles players, A$480,000 for mixed doubles players and A$605,330 for competitors in other events, while A$3,609,470 was used to cover other fees, including players' per diem and trophies.

1Qualifiers prize money is also the Round of 128 prize money.
*per team

Singles players
2015 Australian Open – Men's singles

2015 Australian Open – Women's singles

Day-by-day summaries

Events

Seniors

Men's singles

  Novak Djokovic  defeated  Andy Murray, 7–6(7–5), 6–7(4–7), 6–3, 6–0
This was the third time these two players met in the final. The other two times were in 2011 and 2013, when Djokovic won. This time would prove no different with Djokovic winning his fifth title, an Open Era record, to go along with his titles in 2008, 2011, 2012 and 2013. This victory was Djokovic's eighth grand slam title, tying him in the Open Era with Jimmy Connors, Ivan Lendl and Andre Agassi. This was Murray's fourth loss in the final of the Australian Open, three of them to Djokovic and one to Roger Federer in 2010. This marks the first time since Björn Borg at the US Open that someone has lost all four of his final appearances at a particular grand slam event.

Women's singles

  Serena Williams defeated  Maria Sharapova, 6–3, 7–6(7–5)
This marked the second time these two players met in the final. The other time was in 2007, which Williams won. This time would be exactly the same, with Williams winning her sixth title (an Open Era record), to go along with wins in 2003, 2005, 2007, 2009 and 2010.  This was her nineteenth career grand slam singles title, behind only Steffi Graf's twenty-two titles in the Open Era of tennis. This was Sharapova's third loss in the final; the other two losses were in 2012 to Victoria Azarenka and to Williams in 2007. Sharapova won the title in 2008.

Men's doubles

  Simone Bolelli /  Fabio Fognini defeated  Pierre-Hugues Herbert /  Nicolas Mahut, 6–4, 6–4
This was the first men's doubles title for the team of Bolelli and Fognini at the event and in their respective careers.

Women's doubles

  Bethanie Mattek-Sands /  Lucie Šafářová defeated  Chan Yung-jan /  Zheng Jie, 6–4, 7–6(7–5)
This was the first women's doubles title for the team of Mattek-Sands and Šafářová at the event and in their respective careers.  One of their finalist opponents, Zheng Jie won the title in 2006 with Yan Zi.

Mixed doubles

  Martina Hingis /  Leander Paes defeated  Kristina Mladenovic /  Daniel Nestor, 6–4, 6–3
This was a match of past mixed doubles champions at the event, which Hingis won with Mahesh Bhupathi in 2006, while her partner Paes won titles in 2003 with Martina Navratilova and in 2010 with Cara Black. Their finalist opponents' won the event last year, but Nestor won titles in 2007 with Elena Likhovtseva and 2011 with Katarina Srebotnik. This was Hingis' second mixed doubles title for her career, and for Paes' it is his seventh mixed doubles grand slam crown for his career.

Juniors

Boys' singles

  Roman Safiullin defeated  Hong Seong-chan, 7–5, 7–6(7–2)

Girls' singles

  Tereza Mihalíková defeated  Katie Swan, 6–1, 6–4

Boys' doubles

  Jake Delaney /  Marc Polmans defeated  Hubert Hurkacz /  Alex Molčan, 0–6, 6–2, [10–8]

Girls' doubles

  Miriam Kolodziejová /  Markéta Vondroušová defeated  Katharina Hobgarski /  Greet Minnen, 7–5, 6–4

Wheelchair

Wheelchair men's singles

  Shingo Kunieda defeated  Stéphane Houdet, 6–2, 6–2

Wheelchair women's singles

  Jiske Griffioen defeated  Yui Kamiji, 6–3, 7–5

Wheelchair quad singles

  Dylan Alcott defeated  David Wagner, 6–2, 6–3

Wheelchair men's doubles

  Stéphane Houdet /  Shingo Kunieda defeated  Gustavo Fernández /  Gordon Reid, 6–2, 6–1

Wheelchair women's doubles

  Yui Kamiji /  Jordanne Whiley defeated  Jiske Griffioen /  Aniek van Koot, 4–6, 6–4, 7–5

Wheelchair quad doubles

  Andrew Lapthorne /  David Wagner defeated  Dylan Alcott /  Lucas Sithole, 6–0, 3–6, 6–2

Singles seeds
Seedings are based on rankings as of 12 January 2015. Rankings and points before are as of 19 January 2015.
Points defending includes results from both the 2014 Australian Open and tournaments from the week of 27 January 2014 (Davis Cup for the men, and Paris and Pattaya for the women).

Men's singles

The following players would have been seeded, but they withdrew from the event.

†The player did not qualify for the tournament in 2014. Accordingly, this was the 18th best result deducted instead.

Women's singles

Doubles seeds

Men's doubles

 
1 Rankings were as of 12 January 2015.

Women's doubles

 
 1 Rankings are as of 12 January 2015.

Mixed doubles

 1 Rankings are as of 12 January 2015.

Main draw wildcard entries

As part of an agreement between Tennis Australia, the United States Tennis Association (USTA) and the French Tennis Federation (FFT), one male and one female player from the United States and France received a wild card into the Australian Open singles event. USTA gave it to Denis Kudla and Irina Falconi, thanks to their positions in 2014 USTA Pro Circuit's Australian Open Wild Card Challenge standing, while Lucas Pouille and Océane Dodin were chosen by internal FFT selection.

Further four wildcards were awarded at Asia-Pacific Australian Open Wildcard Playoff into the men's and women's singles and doubles main draw events, while Tennis Australia organized its own playoff competitions, where Jordan Thompson, Daria Gavrilova and Sam Thompson & Masa Jovanovic mixed doubles team received entries to Australian Open.

Remaining wildcard places were filled by Australian internal selection.

Men's singles
  James Duckworth
  Thanasi Kokkinakis
  Denis Kudla
  John Millman
  Lucas Pouille 
  Luke Saville
  Jordan Thompson
  Zhang Ze

Women's singles
  Chang Kai-chen
  Océane Dodin
  Duan Yingying 
  Irina Falconi
  Daria Gavrilova
  Arina Rodionova
  Olivia Rogowska
  Storm Sanders

Men's doubles
  Alex Bolt /  Andrew Whittington 
  James Duckworth /  Luke Saville 
  Matthew Ebden /  Matt Reid 
  Omar Jasika /  John-Patrick Smith 
  Thanasi Kokkinakis /  Nick Kyrgios 
  Lee Hsin-han /  Zhang Ze
  John Millman /  Benjamin Mitchell

Women's doubles
  Monique Adamczak /  Olivia Rogowska 
  Naiktha Bains /  Sara Tomic 
  Kimberly Birrell /  Priscilla Hon 
  Daria Gavrilova /  Storm Sanders 
  Maddison Inglis /  Alexandra Nancarrow 
  Jessica Moore /  Abbie Myers
  Yang Zhaoxuan /  Ye Qiuyu 

Mixed doubles
  Chang Kai-chen /  Zhang Ze 
  Casey Dellacqua /  John Peers 
  Jarmila Gajdošová /  Mahesh Bhupathi 
  Daria Gavrilova /  Luke Saville 
  Masa Jovanovic /  Sam Thompson
  Andreja Klepač /  Chris Guccione 
  Arina Rodionova /  Max Mirnyi

Main draw qualifier entries
The qualifying competition took place in Melbourne Park on 14 – 17 January 2015.

Men's singles

Men's singles qualifiers
  Tim Pütz
  Jürgen Melzer
  Elias Ymer
  Tim Smyczek
  Matthias Bachinger
  Jan Hernych
  Aljaž Bedene
  Jimmy Wang
  Michael Russell
  Ruben Bemelmans
  Marius Copil
  Kyle Edmund
  Alexander Kudryavtsev
  Illya Marchenko
  Yuki Bhambri
  Laurent Lokoli

Lucky loser
  Hiroki Moriya

Women's singles

Women's singles qualifiers
  Denisa Allertová
  Stéphanie Foretz
  Renata Voráčová
  Tatjana Maria
  Alexandra Panova
  Lucie Hradecká
  Ons Jabeur
  Urszula Radwańska
  Richèl Hogenkamp
  Evgeniya Rodina
  Anna Tatishvili
  Petra Martić

Lucky loser
  Yulia Putintseva

Protected ranking
The following players were accepted directly into the main draw using a protected ranking:

Men's singles
  Juan Martín del Potro (PR 7)
  Stéphane Robert (PR 103)

Women's singles
  Bethanie Mattek-Sands (PR 52)
  Romina Oprandi (PR 40)
  Vera Zvonareva (PR 15)

Withdrawals 
The following players were accepted directly into the main tournament but withdrew.

Men's singles
  Marin Čilić → replaced by  James Ward
  Juan Martín del Potro → replaced by  Hiroki Moriya
  Tommy Haas → replaced by  Stéphane Robert
  Jack Sock → replaced by  Máximo González
  Radek Štěpánek → replaced by  Blaž Kavčič
  Janko Tipsarević → replaced by  Marsel İlhan
  Jo-Wilfried Tsonga → replaced by  Kenny de Schepper

Women's singles
  Jana Čepelová → replaced by  Yulia Putintseva
  Petra Cetkovská → replaced by  Alison Van Uytvanck

Retirements 
Men's singles
  Peter Gojowczyk
  Martin Kližan
  Adrian Mannarino
  Tommy Robredo

References

External links